Buddy Rich Band is a 1981 recording made by jazz drummer Buddy Rich with his big band for MCA Records.

Track listing
LP side one:
"Never Can Say Goodbye" (Clifton Davis) – 4:48
"Fantasy" (Eddie del Barrio, Maurice White, Verdine White) – 4:35
"Listen Here Goes Funky" (Eddie Harris) – 3:30
"Slow Funk" (Bob Mintzer) – 5:42
LP side two:
"Beulah Witch" (Don Menza) – 3:31
"Good News" (Mintzer) – 14:24

Personnel
Buddy Rich – leader, drums
The Buddy Rich Band
Harold Wheeler – arranger, co-producer
Robert Mintzer – arranger ("Slow Funk" and "Good News")

References

MCA 5186 (LP), MCAD-31151 (CD)
Steven Jacobetz review at Allmusic.com
Buddy Rich Band at discogs.com
Buddy Rich Band at wax.fm (archived from the original at http://wax.fm/vinyl-lp-releases/buddy_rich_buddy_rich_band.html)

1981 albums
Buddy Rich albums
Albums produced by Joel Dorn
MCA Records albums